Barbara Dunst (born 25 September 1997) is an Austrian footballer who plays as a midfielder for German Frauen-Bundesliga club Eintracht Frankfurt and the Austria women's national team.

Career

Club

Dunst began playing football in 2004 at SV Anger, where she played for eight years in the boys' team. In November 2012, she signed with ÖFB-Frauenliga club LUV Graz, for which she made her debut on 10 November 2012 in a league match against FC Wacker Innsbruck. For the 2014–15 season, she moved to the league rivals and reigning cup winners SKN St. Pölten. With St. Pölten, Dunst won the championship and the cup and repeated this success in the following season. In the UEFA Women's Champions League, her team reached the Round of 32 in both, the 2015–16 season and the 2016–17 season, being eliminated by Verona and Brøndby, respectively. In the second half of the 2016–17 season, Dunst signed a contract with the German Bundesliga club Bayer 04 Leverkusen, for which she debut on 19 February 2017 at a 1–1 tie in a league match against FF USV Jena. On 21 June 2017, Dunst left Leverkusen and moved to MSV Duisburg.

International
Dunst played for the Austria U17 national team between 2013 and 2014. In 2013, she participated with her team in the UEFA Women's Under-17 Championship qualification, where Austria was eliminated in the second round. In 2015, Dunst became part of the Austrian U19 team. In 2016, she played UEFA Women's Under-19 Championship, where Austria was eliminated in the Group Stage. In October 2015, she was first called for the Austrian Senior Team for a European Championship qualifier against Israel. In March 2016, she won the Cyprus Cup with her team. In 2017, Dunst was part of the 23-women squad who represented Austria and reached the semi-finals at the UEFA Women's Euro 2017.

International goals

Notes

References

External links
 
 
 

1997 births
Living people
Austria women's international footballers
Austrian women's footballers
Women's association football midfielders
Bayer 04 Leverkusen (women) players
MSV Duisburg (women) players
Expatriate women's footballers in Germany
FSK St. Pölten-Spratzern players
Frauen-Bundesliga players
1. FFC Frankfurt players
Eintracht Frankfurt (women) players
ÖFB-Frauenliga players
DFC LUV Graz players
Footballers from Graz
UEFA Women's Euro 2022 players
UEFA Women's Euro 2017 players
Austrian expatriate sportspeople in Germany
Austrian expatriate women's footballers